Class 700 may refer to:
New Generation Rollingstock
British Rail Class 700
LSWR 700 class
Midland Railway 700 Class
New South Wales 600/700 class railcar
N700 Series Shinkansen
South Australian Railways 700 class (diesel)
700 Series Shinkansen